Wippler is a surname. Notable people with the surname include:

Harold Wippler (born c. 1928), Denver-based violinist
Migene González-Wippler, Puerto Rican New Age author